The 17th Annual Anugerah Musik Indonesia was held on June 19, 2014, at the Kasablanka Hall in Tebet, South Jakarta. The show was broadcast live on RCTI and was hosted by Raffi Ahmad and Robby Purba. The show was a collaboration between Anugerah Musik Indonesia Foundation and RCTI.

Awards were presented in 48 categories in nine genres of music: Pop and Urban, Rock and Metal, Jazz and Instrumental, Kroncong and Kroncong Contemporary/Style/Opera, Dangdut, children's songs, production work, production support, and general. The event was divided into three segments: AMI Awards Gala Night, Lifetime Achievement Awards, and The Winner's Concert.

Fatin Shidqia led the nominations with eight, and became the biggest winner of the night with five wins, including Best of the Best Album for For You, Best of the Best Newcomer, and Best Pop Female Solo Artist. Other winners included Geisha, who won in four categories, Coboy Junior, who earning three awards and Ayu Ting Ting, Judika & Duma, etc. took home two trophies each.

Violinist Idris Sardi received the "AMI Legend Awards" for his contributions to Indonesian music. His daughter, Santi Sardi, accepted the award on his behalf.

Performers

Presenters 
 Stephanie Poetri and Nadine Waworuntu – Presented Best of the Best Newcomer
 Angel Pieters, Bastian and Tasya Kamila – Presented Best Children Duo/Group/Vocal Group
 Tulus and Bunga Citra Lestari – Presented Best Pop Duo/Group
 Syahrini and Ayu Ting Ting – Presented Best Reggae/Ska/Dub Production Work
 Sophia Latjuba and Superman Is Dead – Presented Best Pop Female Solo Artist
 Thomas Djorghi and Nassar – Presented Best Contemporary Dangdut Female Solo Artist
 Nisa – Presented Best R&B/Soul Production Work
 Ian Antono and Nicky Astria – Presented Best Rock Duo/Group
 Tantowi Yahya – Presented AMI Legend Awards
 Dewa Budjana, Tohpati, Baim, Eross Chandra, Baron and Andre Dinuth – Presented Best of the Best Album
 Gita Gutawa and Kevin Aprilio – Presented Best of the Best Production Work

Nominees and winners 
The nominees were announced on May 31, 2014. Winners are listed first and highlighted in boldface.

Pop/Urban

Rock/Metal

Jazz/Instrumental

Contemporary Kroncong/Kroncong/Style/Opera

Malay Dangdut/Contemporary Dangdut/Dangdut

Children

Production Work

Field Production Support

General

Artist with most nominations and awards 

The following artist received most nominations:

The following artist received most awards:

References

External links 
 Official sites

2014 in Indonesia
2014 music awards
Indonesian music awards
Anugerah Musik Indonesia